The 2016 FIM Moto3 World Championship was a part of the 68th F.I.M. Road Racing World Championship season. Danny Kent was the reigning series champion but did not defend his title as he joined the series' intermediate class, Moto2.

The riders' championship title was won by Ajo Motorsport rider Brad Binder, after a second-place finish at the Aragon Grand Prix gave him an unassailable lead over his title rivals with four races remaining. Binder, who finished each of the first seven races on the podium, took the championship lead after the second race in Argentina, and took his first Grand Prix victory at the Spanish Grand Prix – starting from 35th on the grid. With four additional wins prior to Aragon, Binder was never headed in the championship thereafter to become South Africa's third world motorcycle racing champion, after Kork Ballington and Jon Ekerold. Binder took two further victories before the end of the season, in Australia and Valencia, en route to an eventual championship winning margin of 142 points over his next closest competitor. Compared to Binder's seven wins, no other rider was able to take more than two, with eight fellow riders taking at least one win during the 2016 season.

A fourth-place finish in Valencia sealed the runner-up position for Gresini Racing's Enea Bastianini. Despite missing two races through injury and a slow start to the season, Bastianini then achieved six podium finishes in nine races, including his only win of the season in Japan. Five riders were also in position to take third place at the finale; top Mahindra rider Francesco Bagnaia, Jorge Navarro and a trio of rookie riders also battling for Rookie of the Year honours, Nicolò Bulega, Joan Mir and Fabio Di Giannantonio. Bagnaia was taken out of the race by Gabriel Rodrigo, with a ninth-place finish for Navarro allowing him to take third position by five points. Both riders took two victories during the season; Navarro winning in Catalonia and Aragon, with Bagnaia doing so at Assen and Malaysia, the first wins for Mahindra at Grand Prix level. Mir and Di Giannantonio battled on-track in Valencia for the top rookie position, which ultimately went to Mir, as he finished second to Di Giannatonio's fifth position. Mir won the Austrian Grand Prix, one of two rookies to win during 2016.

Four other riders won races during the season; the other rookie winner Khairul Idham Pawi took two wet-weather victories in Argentina and Germany, becoming the first rider from Malaysia to win at World Championship level. Single race wins went to Romano Fenati in Austin, before a mid-season dismissal from Valentino Rossi's team, Niccolò Antonelli won the season-opening race in a photo-finish in Qatar, while John McPhee took his, and Peugeot's, first Grand Prix win in wet conditions at Brno. With nine wins during the campaign, KTM won their fourth Moto3 constructors' title in five years, finishing 32 points clear of Honda, with six wins. All four full-season manufacturers took at least one win.

Changes for 2016
French oil and gas giants company Total was selected to become official fuel supplier of Moto2 and Moto3 beginning from 2016 onwards, replacing Eni after five seasons as a fuel supplier of Moto2 and Moto3.

Calendar
The following Grands Prix took place in 2016.

 ‡ = Night race

Calendar changes
 The Grand Prix of the Americas and the Argentine Grand Prix have swapped places, with Argentina hosting the second round, while the Grand Prix of the Americas hosts the third round.
 For the first time in the history of the Dutch TT, the races were held on a Sunday.
 The 2016 season had seen the return of the Austrian Grand Prix to the series' schedule after 19 years of  absence. The last race, which had been the 1997 Austrian Grand Prix, was held at the A1 Ring, now called the Red Bull Ring.
 Having been on the calendar since 2008, the Indianapolis Grand Prix was taken off the calendar.

Teams and riders
A provisional entry list was announced on 7 November 2015. All teams used Dunlop tyres.

Rider changes
 Joan Mir, Andrea Locatelli, and Fabio Quartararo joined Leopard Racing, filling seat vacated by Danny Kent and Efrén Vázquez who moved up to Moto2 and Hiroki Ono joining Honda Team Asia.
 2015 Red Bull MotoGP Rookies Cup Champion, Bo Bendsneyder made his Moto3 debut with Red Bull KTM Ajo, filling the seat vacated by Miguel Oliveira who moved up to Moto2.
 Karel Hanika rode for Platinum Bay Real Estate, replacing Alessandro Tonucci moves to Moto2. After Catalan GP, Hanika left and replaced by Danny Webb for 2 rounds. Later, replaced by Marcos Ramírez for the rest of season.
 Fabio Spiranelli made his Moto3 debut, joining CIP. Replacing Remy Gardner who moved up to Moto2.
 Fabio Di Giannantonio made his Moto3 debut, joining Gresini Racing after riding for them as a replacement for Andrea Locatelli in the 2015 Valencia GP.
 After 2015 season as wildcard in Valencia, Nicolò Bulega made his Moto3 debut, joining Sky Racing Team VR46.
 Adam Norrodin rode for SIC Racing Team, replacing Zulfahmi Khairuddin.
 Arón Canet made his Moto3 debut, joining Estrella Galicia 0,0.
 Juan Francisco Guevara joined RBA Racing Team. replacing both Isaac Viñales moved to Moto2 and Ana Carrasco left the team.
 Khairul Idham Pawi made his Moto3 debut, joining Honda Team Asia.
 Both Stefano Valtulini and Lorenzo Petrarca will rode for 3570 Team Italia, filling seat vacated by both Stefano Manzi and Manuel Pagliani.

Notes

Results and standings

Grands Prix

Riders' standings
Scoring system
Points were awarded to the top fifteen finishers. A rider had to finish the race to earn points.

Manufacturers' standings
Points were awarded to the top fifteen finishers. A rider had to finish the race to earn points.

 Each constructor got the same number of points as their best placed rider in each race.

Notes

References

External links
 The official website of Grand Prix motorcycle racing

Moto3
Grand Prix motorcycle racing seasons